Sir Mathuradas Vissanji (1916-1949) was an Indian businessman, politician and philanthropist.

Life 

He was born on 18 March 1916 in Mumbai, Maharashtra.

He died on 22 December 1949.

Career

Business career 

He has been described as a visionary of the textile industry. He founded the Wallace Mills Company, a family owned textile business, which is today managed by his grandson Hemant Vissanji. The Vissanji family also owned the Bombay Burmah Trading Company which is worth over 1 billion $USD today.

He was the very first President of the Cotton Association of India.

Political career 

He was elected to the Bombay Legislative Assembly in 1935.

In the 1934 Indian general election, he was elected to the Central Legislative Assembly.

Philanthrophy 

He founded the Andheri Education Society.

He established the Vissanji Academy, a charitable school that still functions till this day. The school is today managed by his son Pratapsinh Vissanji.

Awards and honours 

At the 1943 Birthday Honours of King George VI, he was conferred with a knighthood. His name was thus published as Sir Mathuradas Vissanji by the London Gazette from then on.

He has also received an honorary Doctorate of Literature (D.Litt.) from the Benares Hindu University.

In 1940, he became an honorary Sheriff of Mumbai.

Family 

Sir Mathuradas Vissanji's son was a prominent Indian industrialist, his granddaughter Panna Khatau was married to Sunit Khatau, a member of the Khatau business family.

See also 
 Purshottamdas Thakurdas

References

External links
 

1916 births
1949 deaths
Indian businesspeople
Indian Knights Bachelor